Mangal Singh Ramgarhia CSI (1800–1879) was a prominent Sikh leader, a Sardar, who participated in the first and second Anglo-Sikh wars. Later, he was appointed manager of the Golden Temple of Amritsar.
He carried the title of "Sardar-i-Bawaqar" (the Sardar with Prestige).

Mangal Singh was the son of Diwan Singh and grandson of Tara Singh Ramgarhia, a brother of the Sikh leader Jassa Singh Ramgarhia.
He was heir to some of the estates of Jassa Singh's son Jodh Singh. In 1834, he was sent to Peshawar to command 400 foot soldiers and 110 sawars (cavalrymen) of the old Ramgarhia class. There, under Tej Singh and Hari Singh Nalwa, he fought in the Battle of Jamrud in April 1837.

During the reign of Sher Singh, Mangal Singh was employed in Suket, Mandi and Kullu, and remained there until the end of the Satluj War in 1846.

During the Second Sikh War, Mangal Singh was noted for his work in guarding the roads, and in maintaining order in the Amritsar and Gurdaspur Districts.

Honours
Manager of the Sikh Temple of Amritsar (1862)
Honorary Magistrate of Amritsar (1862-1879)
Member of Vice-Regal Durbar. (1864) 
Companionship Star of India (1876)

References

[Thank You]

Indian Sikhs
Sikh warriors
History of Punjab
Punjabi people
1800 births
1879 deaths
Ramgarhia people